Heraclea Sintica, Heracleia Sintica, Хераклея Синтика in Bulgarian or Herakleia Sintike, or Heraclea ex Sintiis, also known as Heraclea Strymonus or Herakleia Strymonos (Ἡράκλεια Στρυμόνος, 'Heraclea on the Strymon river'), was a Thracian polis, conquered by Philip II of Macedon. It was located in Thracian lands of the Ancient kingdom of Macedon, in the region of Sintice, on the right bank of the Strymon river. It was connected with Philippi by the Roman road that passed round the north side of the lake, at a distance of 55 M.P., and by that which passed on the south side, at a distance of 52 M.P.

The general Asclepiodotus of Heraclea was a native. Demetrius, son of Philip V of Macedon, was slain at Heraclea Sintica. Coins minted here in antiquity have survived.

Its site is near the modern village of Rupite, Bulgaria.

The polis was identified by Assoc. Prof. Georgi Mitrev (University of Plovdiv) after the accidental discovery of a large Latin inscription in 2002. In essence, this is letter of Emperor Galerius and Caesar Maximinus II from 308 AD in which the rulers are turning to Herakleians in response to their request to reclaim the lost city rights. Before 2005 Assoc. Prof. Georgi Mitrev published another inscription, which mentions Guy Lucius Skotussaios and Harakleios. It proves conclusively that this is precisely Heraclea Sintica, not another Herculaneum or Heraclea, as this name is very popular in the ancient world.

Since 2007 archaeological excavations have been taking place at Heraclea Sintica, led by Assoc. Prof. Lyudmil Vagalinski, of the National Institute with Museum of Archaeology in Sofia. They noticed strange structures above it: tunnels and an arch. Later on, after geosonar examination by Russian specialists, a large studio for producing ceramic masks for an unknown and as yet unrevealed ancient theatre was discovered.

See also 
 List of ancient Greek cities

References

Bibliography
 Claude Lepelley: Une inscription ďHeraclea Sintica (Macédoine) récemment découverte, révélant un rescrit de ľempereur Galère restituant ses droits à la cite. in: Zeitschrift für Papyrologie und Epigraphik, 146 (2004), 221–231.
 Georgi Mitrev: Civitas Heracleotarum. Heracleia Sintica or the Ancient City at the Village of Rupite (Bulgaria). in: Zeitschrift für Papyrologie und Epigraphik, 145 (2003), 263–272.
 Georgi Mitrev: On Skotoussa and „Scotusaei liberi” from the valley of the Strymon River. in: Arheologia Bulgarica, XII (2008), 2, 47–58.
Konrat Ziegler und Walter Sontheimer (Hrsg.): Der Kleine Pauly'' Bd. 2 (1975), Sp. 1034–1035.
Emil Nankov: “In Search of a Founder and the Early Years of Heraclea Sintica,” In: Vagalinski, L. and Nankov, E. (eds.) Heraclea Sintica: from Hellenistic polis to Roman civitas (4th c. BC-6th c. AD), Proceedings from a conference at Petrich, September 19–21, 2013, Papers of the American Research Center in Sofia, vol. 2, 7-35.

Ancient Greek archaeological sites in Bulgaria
Populated places in ancient Macedonia
Populated places in ancient Thrace
Argead colonies
History of Blagoevgrad Province
Former populated places in Bulgaria